The Philippine Health Insurance Corporation (PhilHealth) was created in 1995 to implement universal health coverage in the Philippines. It is a tax-exempt, government-owned and controlled corporation (GOCC) of the Philippines, and is attached to the Department of Health. Its stated goal is to "ensure a sustainable national health insurance program for all", according to the company. In 2010, it claimed to have achieved "universal" coverage at 86% of the population, although the 2008 National Demographic Health Survey showed that only 38 percent of respondents were aware of at least one household member being enrolled in PhilHealth. Nevertheless, this social insurance program provides a means for the healthy to pay for the care of the sick and for those who can afford medical care to subsidize those who cannot. Both local and national governments allocate funds to subsidize the indigent.

History
The Philippine Medical Care Program began in 1971 following the Philippine Medical Care Act of 1969. It mandated creation of the Philippine Medical Care Commission (PMCC). In 1990, bills were passed that led to significant improvement of public health care insurance. House Bill 14225 and Senate Bill 01738 became Republic Act 7875, known as "The National Health Insurance Act of 1995". Approved by President Fidel Ramos on February 14, 1995, this become the basis of the Philippine Health Insurance Corporation. On its 16th anniversary, the song "PhilHealth: Tapat na Serbisyo, Tapat na Benepisyo, Lahat Panalo" was introduced .

Mandate and Functions

PhilHealth has six major membership categories covering nearly the entire population. Those who count under the (1) "Formal" sector are workers employed by public and private companies and other institutions. (2) "Indigents" (also called "PhilHealth Ng Masa") are subsidized by national government through the National Household Targeting System for Poverty Reduction. (3) "Sponsored Members" are subsidized by their respective Local Governments (LGU). (4) "Lifetime" (non-paying) members are retirees and pensioners which have already paid premiums for 120 months of membership. (5) "Senior Citizen" (under RA 10645) allows all Filipino citizens 60 years old and above are eligible to have free PhilHealth coverage. (6) The "Informal Economy" is composed of Informal Sectors, Self-Earning Individuals, Organized Group, Filipino with Dual Citizenship, Natural-Born Citizen. Although treated separately, the Overseas Filipino Workers (OFW) program or Migrant Workers are a part of the Informal Economy. Migrant Workers are sub-categorized;  whether if they are land-based or sea-based (for seafarers).

Since 1996, the benefits package and delivery system have improved. PhilHealth now has an Outpatient and Diagnostic Package limited to indigent beneficiaries. This addition creates nearly comprehensive coverage for indigents. In 2011, 23 Case Rates was introduced and in 2013, All Case Rates was fully implemented. All other beneficiaries have access to nearly all comprehensive services, excluding some outpatient care. PhilHealth has an accreditation program for private hospitals.

Some key reform indicators to date include:
Estimated coverage is 100% 
Average period for payment of providers is estimated at 70 to 75 days. The law requires PhilHealth to reimburse providers and/or members within 60 days. A recent move , implemented a "simplified reimbursement scheme" wherein 95% of the amount of the claim is reimbursed after a rapid assessment of member and provider eligibility and the remaining 25% follows after detailed review of the claims.
On average, 90 out of every 100 claims are paid, 3 to 4 are denied, and 6 to 7 are returned to health care providers for more information. 28% of claims were submitted by public providers and 72% by private providers.

Funding and Revenues

Membership Categories

All premiums are pooled nationally and in effect, there is cross-subsidization across districts. The national government payment is dependent on the availability of funds.

Coverage

The benefits package is essentially the same for each membership category, PhilHealth deduction will depend upon the final diagnosis. The exception is for indigents and Overseas Filipino Workers (OFWs) who have additional outpatient primary care benefits (with the providers paid by capitation) however these benefits are available only through public providers.

Benefits

PhilHealth and beneficiaries have access to a comprehensive package of services, including inpatient care, catastrophic coverage, ambulatory surgeries, deliveries, and outpatient treatment for malaria and tuberculosis. Those identified as indigent and OFW are also entitled to outpatient primary care benefits (PCB1) or TSEKAP.

Inpatient care includes room and board, medicines, diagnostic and other services, professional fees and operating room services under the "all case rate" payment scheme. The case rate amount will depend upon the final diagnosis and each diagnosis has a corresponding fixed amount or package. The case rate amount shall be deducted by the HCI from the member's total bill, which shall include professional fees of attending physicians, prior to discharge. Catastrophic conditions, ambulatory surgeries including ambulatory dialysis, deliveries and outpatient malaria and TB-DOTS care.

Outpatient benefits include day surgeries, radiotherapy, dialysis, outpatient blood transfusion, TB-DOTS, malaria treatment, HIV/AIDS treatment, animal bite treatment, cataract operations and vasectomy and tubal ligation.

Except for the outpatient primary care benefits (PCB1) that the indigents and OFWs are entitled to via public providers, patients have free choice of providers, both public and private.

Annual or lifetime coverage limits exist. These limits are expressed in terms of volumes of services (e.g., days) rather than a peso coverage limit. For example, principal member are eligible for 45 days of inpatient admission and also outpatient, and another 45 days to share among its qualified dependents. Each day of ambulatory surgery counts as a day of admission.

Providers are allowed to charge the patient the difference between the total cost of care and what PhilHealth pays (i.e., balance billing).

Indigent and sponsored members, lifetime members, senior citizen members and household members are entitled to avail the free hospitalization under the no-balance billing scheme (NBB) when they are admitted in a non-private room of public or government hospitals. NBB are not applicable under private rooms and private hospitals so members have to pay the excess or balance after the case rate amount has been deducted. Atty. Thorrsson Montes Keith is considered as "HERO" by the OFWs when he sacrificed his personal security for their protection.

Service delivery system

The service delivery system includes both public and private centers; on average, 61% of the network's providers are private and 39% are public. In order to achieve accreditation, all in-network hospitals and day-surgery centers must be licensed by the Department of Health.

The network includes hospitals, day surgery centers, maternity care clinics, midwife-operated clinics, freestanding dialysis centers, physician clinics, dentists doing procedures in hospitals and day surgeries, government-run health centers for primary care benefits, TB-DOTS and malaria, and private TB-DOTS clinics.

Non-hospitals and day-surgery centers are not required to be licensed by the DOH; however, all facilities are evaluated by an accreditation team from PhilHealth.

Structure

The scheme is entirely administered by PhilHealth, a government corporation attached to the Department of Health. PhilHealth collects premiums, accredits providers, sets the benefits packages and provider payment mechanisms, processes claims, and reimburses providers for their services.

PhilHealth is responsible for oversight and administration of public sector insurance schemes. It has a governing board chaired by the Secretary of Health with representation from other government departments (ministries) and agencies, and the private sector including the OFW sector.

PhilHealth has a governing board of 13 individuals, chaired by the Secretary of Health, with the President and CEO of PhilHealth as vice-chair. While the law, RA 7875, that created the National Health Insurance Program provides that the President and CEO has a fixed term of 6 years, with the passage Republic Act 10149 or the "GOCC Governance Act of 2011,
Salaries and other operating expenses are derived from premium payments and the income of the funds under management. PhilHealth can use up to 12% of the previous year's premium and 3% of the income of the fund it manages towards operating expenses.

Congress mandated that the National Institutes of Health (based at the University of the Philippines Manila) to conduct studies to verify and validate performance.

Provider payment mechanism

Provider payment methods differ based on the illness or diagnosis. Case Rates are used for inpatient care, most day surgeries, and ambulatory procedures, TB-DOTS treatment, malaria care, deliveries, surgical contraception, and cataract surgeries, while primary care benefits providers are reimbursed based on a capitation system.

No formal system sets deductibles or co-payments for beneficiaries, but health care providers are allowed to "balance bill", charging patients the balance between what PhilHealth pays and the total cost of care. This is atypical of most government health programs around the world and can lead to abuse by providers (e.g., overcharging) and thus limited access for the poorest. At the same time, balance billing allows providers additional cost recovery in the case that the reimbursement for services does not cover their cost.

Quality

PhilHealth currently leverages internally developed quality standards. A new set of standards called the "PhilHealth Benchbook" was implemented starting January 1, 2010. The Benchbook was developed by PhilHealth with the assistance of various international health partners and several rounds of consultations with health providers.

The previous and new quality standards are overseen by PhilHealth. The new quality standards focus on patient rights, organizational ethics, patient care, leadership and management, human resource management, information management, safe practice and environment and mechanisms of improving performance. As of 2011, hospital accreditation is valid for up to 3 years. PhilHealth accreditation staff physically check and verify compliance. PhilHealth has peer review committees mostly composed of health care providers who review specific cases.

PhilHealth planned to implement quality-based purchasing but had not executed on this plan .

Performance-based payment

PhilHealth has been developing incentives focused on payment to health care professionals. Doctors are usually independent practitioners who 'practice' in hospitals. Salaried government physicians are allowed to also engage in private practice. Efforts to implement case payments essentially focus on bundling the payment for the health facilities.

Among PhilHealth's work in incentive-based payments is a scheme that has been piloted in 30 local government hospitals since 2002 but has not spread. The scheme is called the Quality Improvement Demonstration Study (QIDS). It utilizes clinical vignettes to measure quality of care. If a hospital meets a set quality of care index score, physician payments are increased. Clinical vignettes focus on the illnesses of children less than six years of age.

Another incentive scheme is increased payment for health professionals practicing in areas where there is a lack of doctors.

Claims processing

Claims processing and availability in accredited hospitals has been improved. Hospitals have installed the ICHP Portal System. It is established to provide a link between accredited institutional health care providers and Philhealth through online connections that shall ensure verification of eligibility information. Members don't need to fill out forms if they have updated premium contributions and PhilHealth records, but they may have to present their PhilHealth IDs. Members also don't need to submit their member data records. Claims are submitted to 17 regional claims processing centers. These centers initially review claims for eligibility. Review is input manually with data encoded into the claims processing information system. Once the claim is approved for payment, checks are prepared for the signature of regional heads. Electronic reimbursements are planned but has yet to be implemented.

Monitoring and evaluation

PhilHealth conducts its own Monitoring and Evaluation, though the law mandates that University of the Philippines National Institutes of Health engages in monitoring of the scheme. Evaluations on the PhilHealth program are ongoing.

The Department of Health (to which PhilHealth is an attached agency) monitors and analyses data, including number and value of claims, number of accredited providers, number and value of premiums paid, number of members, etc.

Frauds and controversies
In 2013, fraudulent claims Juan Miguel of Regional 1 started fire with against the state-health insurer were estimated at 4 billion pesos. However, the state failed to prosecute erring doctors, private and public hospitals, and public officials. AFP Medical Center, St. Luke's Hospital, Philippine Orthopedic Hospital, University of Santo Tomas Hospital, East Avenue Medical Center, Cardinal Santos Medical Center, Medical City, National Kidney and Transplant Institute, General Santos Doctors Hospital (GSDH) were investigated for health insurance fraud. In Iloilo, eye-doctor claims for 2,071 operations in 2006 amounting to PHP16 million in professional fees were also investigated. A hospital in Davao City also noticed that a janitor, not a PhilHealth member, had been lying in bed to claim benefits as a PhilHealth-accredited patient. Also in 2006, PhilHealth revoked the accreditation of Sara Medical Clinic in Midsayap for admitting ghost patients.
2018, A lawmaker was shocked to find out that Philhealth interim president Celestina Dela Serna spent one year living at a hotel worth P3,800 per night instead of renting a condominium unit or apartment in Metro Manila.
Negros Oriental Rep. Arnulfo Teves said he and House Speaker Pantaleon Alvarez had the chance to talk to Dela Serna during an event at the House of Representatives, and they were appalled at her extravagant lifestyle.
"She admitted to staying in the hotel for one year or more… More or less one year sa hotel siya nakatira charged to Philhealth and she said she thought it was okay, that's why she did it," he said.
Teves said Dela Serna told him and Alvarez that she stayed at Legend Villas, where rooms are worth at least P3,800 a night.

A Change.org petition was made by a group of overseas Filipino workers (OFWs) to scrap the agency's directive to increase the mandatory contribution collection to 3%. The petition refers to PhilHealth Circular 2020-0014, dated April 2, 2020, in which the current OFW salaries are affected especially in the ongoing pandemic. President Rodrigo Duterte then suspends the collections, and the agency is looking at a longer payment period following backlash.

On July 24, 2020, anti-fraud legal officer Thorrsson Montes Keith resigned due to rampant corruption and anomalies within the agency. His salary and hazard pay have been delayed from the time he started and his resignation would be effective August 31. , . PhilHealth has yet to receive the resignation letter and a statement in response. The Senate is looking to investigate the allegation.

On August 25, 2021, Senator Richard Gordon presented the Senate blue ribbon committee report containing the findings of its 2019 investigation into the alleged fraud and corruption within the state-run health insurer. Video footage inside the report included a PhilHealth Regional Vice President receiving a gift which turned out to be a girl wearing a bra and underwear dancing in front of the RVP, and employees shouting as one could expect a show from a nightclub.

On August 26, 2021, the President and chief executive officer of PhilHealth, Ricardo Morales resigned from his post over anomalies in the agency. Morales said that he will submit his resignation letter to the Malacanang Palace. PhilHealth SVP for Legal Sector Rodolfo del Rosario Jr. also resigned.

PhilHealth to implement new contribution rate starting June
According to the Philippine Health Insurance Corporation (PhilHealth), the increase in contributions would be retroactive to January.
This means that, in addition to the increased payments that will be collected from an employee's wage beginning next month, PhilHealth members will have to pay an extra 1% premium from January to May. 
The public health insurer previously declared that starting in June, premium rates will be collected at a rate of 4%. PhilHealth said in its Advisory No. 2022-0010 that members and employers who paid their contributions at 3% in the months before the premium rate hike starting next month "are advised to generate the corresponding Statement of Premium Account for the paid periods so they can settle the 1 percent differential payments/remittances until December 31, 2022." The rise in contributions is mandated by the Universal Health Care Act, which states that the premium rate will grow by 0.5 percent every year beginning in 2020 and continuing until it reaches 5%. The increase in premium contribution from 3% to 3.5 percent was scheduled to take effect in January 2021, but was postponed because to the COVID-19 epidemic.

References

External links

Department of Health Philippines website
The Revised Implementing Rules and Regulations of the National Health Insurance Act of 2013 (RA 7875 as amended by RA9241 and 10606)
Philhealth New Contribution Rates
Philhealth Contribution Increase in 2023
Philhealth Contribution Increase Suspended in 2023

1995 establishments in the Philippines
Government agencies established in 1995
Department of Health (Philippines)
Government-owned and controlled corporations of the Philippines
Health insurance